opened in Tsu, Mie Prefecture, Japan in 1987. The collection comprises some 1,300 replicas of famous statues from the Louvre—as agreed with then director —and other collections, and includes those of the Venus de Milo, Winged Victory of Samothrace, Apollo Belvedere, Townley Discobolus, and Bust of Nefertiti, as well as of Michelangelo's Moses.

See also
 Mie Prefectural Museum
 Mie Prefectural Art Museum
 Sekisui Museum
 Ise Jingū

References

External links
  Japon Louvre Sculpture Museum

Tsu, Mie
Museums in Mie Prefecture
Museums established in 1987
1987 establishments in Japan
Art museums and galleries in Japan
Louvre